Mondli Gungubele (born 1 February 1957) is a South African politician, trade union leader and educator who is the current Minister of Communications and Digital Technologies and a member of the National Assembly of South Africa for the African National Congress. He previously served as Executive Mayor of the Ekurhuleni Metropolitan Municipality (2010–2016), as Deputy Minister of Finance (2018–2019), as Chairperson of the Social Development Committee (2019–2021) and as Minister in the Presidency (2021–2023).

Early life and education
Gungubele was born on 1 February 1957. He has a Bachelor of Commerce (BCom) degree in law as well as a National Diploma in Nursing. He taught at Falo Senior Secondary School from 1980 to 1981.

Early political career
Between 1983 and 1990, he served as a trade union leader in the National Union of Mineworkers (NUM). He was active in the Congress of South African Trade Unions from 1989 to 1991. Gungubele was the national organiser of the South African Health Workers Congress in 1991. A member of the African National Congress, he served as chairperson of the ANC's branches in Joubert Park and Vosloorus. Gungubele was a founder member of the ANC's East Rand region in 1991 after the party was unbanned. From 1992 to 2017 he served on the provincial executive committee of the ANC in Gauteng.

Gauteng government 
In the first multi-racial elections in 1994, he was elected to the Gauteng Provincial Legislature as an ANC representative. He served as the Member of the Executive Council for multiple portfolios during his time in the Gauteng government. He was the MEC for Social Development and Community Services from 1994 to  1997, when he was appointed as MEC for Health, a position he held until 1999. In 1999, he was appointed to head the Sport, Recreation, Arts and Culture portfolio. Gungubele later became chairperson of the Economic Affairs Portfolio Committee. He resigned from the legislature in 2007.

National parliament and mayor of Ekurhuleni 
Gungubele was elected to the National Assembly of South Africa in the 2009 parliamentary elections. He resigned in November 2010 to take up the position of mayor of the Ekurhuleni Metropolitan Municipality. Deputy Minister Mzwandile Masina was nominated as the ANC's mayoral candidate for Ekurhuleni for the August 2016 local elections. Masina was elected to replace Gungubele as mayor after the election, while Gungubele took up his seat in the National Assembly. In 2017, he was elected to the National Executive Committee of the African National Congress.

Deputy Minister of Finance and parliamentary career 
After Cyril Ramaphosa was elected president of South Africa in February 2018, he appointed Gungubele as Deputy Minister of Finance. Gungubele held the position until after the May 8, 2019 elections when David Masondo was appointed to replace him. He was one of only two deputy ministers who were not reappointed to the national executive. In July 2019, he was elected to head the Portfolio Committee on Social Development.

In June 2021, he became a member of the Committee for Section 194 Enquiry which will determine Public Protector Busisiwe Mkhwebane's fitness to hold office.

Minister in the Presidency 
During a cabinet reshuffle on 5 August 2021, Ramaphosa appointed Gungubele as Minister in the Presidency, replacing the late Jackson Mthembu, who succumbed to COVID-19 in January. As a consequence of this, Gungubele stepped down as chair of the social development committee and lost his committee memberships. He was sworn into office on 6 August.

In January 2022, Ramaphosa designated Gungubele in terms of Section 209(2) of the Constitution to "assume political responsibility for the control and direction" of the State Security Agency. Ramaphosa's decision was criticised by the Democratic Alliance (DA) as "nothing more than a political chess move".

Gungubele was re-elected to another five-year term on the ANC NEC at the party's 55th National Conference held in December 2022.

During a cabinet reshuffle on 6 March 2023, Gungubele was appointed as  Minister of Communications and Digital Technologies.

Political positions 
Gungubele has been described as a close ally to president Ramaphosa. He was critical of former president Jacob Zuma. He condemned the violent riots that occurred in KwaZulu-Natal and Gauteng in July 2021.

References

External links

Mr Mondli Gungubele at Parliament of South Africa
Mondli Gungubele, Mr at Government of South Africa

|-

|-

1957 births
Living people
Government ministers of South Africa
Mayors of Ekurhuleni
Members of the National Assembly of South Africa